Andreína Llamozas is a pageant titleholder, was born in Caraballeda, Venezuela on 1980. She is the Miss Venezuela International titleholder for 1999, and was the official representative of Venezuela to the Miss International 1999 pageant held in Tokyo, Japan, on December 14, 1999, when she classified in the Top 15 semifinalists.

Llamozas competed in the national beauty pageant Miss Venezuela 1999 and obtained the title of Miss Venezuela International. She represented the Vargas state.

References

External links
Miss Venezuela Official Website
Miss International Official Website

1980 births
Living people
People from Caracas
Miss Venezuela International winners
Miss International 1999 delegates